Abdukhamidullo Rasulov (born January 10, 1976), is an Uzbek professional football assistant referee. He has been an assistant referee on international level since 2005. At the FIFA World Cup 2014 he was an assistant referee of Ravshan Irmatov.

In November 2012, he was selected by the AFC as best assistant referee at the AFC Annual Awards.

Tournaments 
Rasulov was assistant referee at the following tournaments:

 AFC Asian Cup 2011
 FIFA Confederations Cup 2013 
 FIFA World Cup 2014
 AFC Asian Cup 2015
 FIFA World Cup 2018

Matches

 Australia–Kuwait (Group A)
 Qatar–Iran (Group C)
 Japan–Jordan (Group D)
 Australia–United Arab Emirates (Semi-final)

References

External links
 
 
 

1976 births
2014 FIFA World Cup referees
Living people
Sportspeople from Tashkent
Uzbekistani football referees
2018 FIFA World Cup referees